The Philadelphia PGA Championship is the annual section championship of the Philadelphia Section of the PGA of America. It has been played since 1922 on courses throughout the Philadelphia area, including courses in Delaware and New Jersey.  The most notable winner of this event is 1959 Masters Tournament champion Art Wall Jr., who won this event five times. In addition, several PGA Tour pros have had victories in this tournament, including Henry Williams, Jr. (three times), Ed Dougherty (three times), Clarence Hackney (two times), Al Besselink (two times), Gene Kunes (two times), Marty Furgol, and noted golf course designer George Fazio.

Winners

External links 
 PGA of America – Philadelphia section
 Trenham Golf History: Section Championships 1922–1939
 Trenham Golf History: Section Championships 1940–1956
 Trenham Golf History: Section Championships 1960–1979
 Trenham Golf History: Section Championships 1980–1999
 Trenham Golf History: Section Championships 2000–2012

Golf in Pennsylvania
Golf in Delaware
Golf in New Jersey
Sports in Philadelphia 
PGA of America sectional tournaments
Recurring sporting events established in 1922
1922 establishments in Pennsylvania